What has become known as the first Miss America pageant was, at its start in 1921, an activity designed to attract tourists to extend their Labor Day holiday weekend and enjoy festivities in Atlantic City, New Jersey. Atlantic City's Inter-City Beauty Contest, as it was initially called, attracted over 1,500 photographic entries from around the country, all vying to win the "Golden Mermaid" award and cash prizes.

Six "Inter-City Beauties," arrived in Atlantic City and entered a new event: The "Inter-City Beauty" Contest. It was judged in stylish afternoon attire not only by the judges, but also the public, who shared in 50 percent of the final score. Personality played a large role in the voting as masses of people surrounded each entrant to get to know her better and throw questions at them throughout the event. Later, the entrants were escorted and presented on the stage of the Keith Theatre on the Garden Pier.

The amateur prize, the Watkins Trophy, was awarded to Miss Washington, DC, Margaret Gorman, Miss South Jersey, Kathryn M. Gearon placed second, receiving $100 in gold. A special professional prize, the Endicott Trophy, was awarded to Miss New York, silent film actress Virginia Lee.

An immediate hit with the crowds, the "Inter-City Beauties" were later judged head-to-head against two other "Beauty" winners in selected classes of the now famous Bather's Revue: an "amateur winner" from over two hundred local women and tourists, and a "professional winner," which included a field of eleven professional models and actresses. In this extravagant and much-hyped final event, Margaret Gorman won the Grand Prize: the Golden Mermaid trophy.

Gorman decided to enter the contest the following year and, since Washington, D.C. had already selected another contestant to represent their area in the 1922 contest, officials allowed Gorman to compete as "Miss America" just two weeks prior to the competition which marks the first time the title was actually used.

Results

Placements

Awards

Contestants

Notes

References

Secondary sources

External links
 Miss America official website

1921
1921 in the United States
September 1921 events
Events in Atlantic City, New Jersey